The Noun River is a river in the West Province of Cameroon. It arises at Lake Oku and flows south, it is joined by the Monoun River and flows south in the valley between the mountains Ngotsetzezan and Mount Yahou. It turns east at about 5° N latitude.  Its mouth is at the Mbam River, which itself is a tributary of the Sanaga River.

It forms the boundary between the Bamiléké area and the Bamun area, and played a key role in the history of the Bamiléké people.

The Noun River was dammed at Bamendjing in 1975 creating a reservoir with the same name. At its maximum the reservoir is 32 km (20 mi) long and 27 km (17 mi) wide. Its surface area varies between 150 km2 (57.9 mi2) and 300 km2 (116 mi2).

The Noun River hosts hippopotamus that can be seen all year long, in the wild parts of the river, along with many birds, such as the palm nut vulture, the bee-eater, the hammerkop, and the kingfisher.

Gallery

Notes

Rivers of Cameroon